Windstar may be:

 Ford Windstar, a minivan
 Windstar Cruises, a cruise line
 Wind Star (ship), one of Windstar's sailing vessels
 Windstar Foundation, an environmental education organization founded by John Denver and Thomas Crum 
 Windstar Records, a record label founded by John Denver
 Windstar turbine, a vertical axis wind turbine
 Zero Gravity Windstar, a South Korean paraglider design